Chi Chunxue (born 4 January 1998) is a Chinese cross-country skier. She competed in the women's 15 kilometre skiathlon at the 2018 Winter Olympics. She competed at the 2022 Winter Olympics, in Women's 10 kilometre classical, Women's 30 kilometre freestyle, Women's 15 kilometre skiathlon, Women's sprint, and Women's 4 × 5 kilometre relay.

References

External links
 

1998 births
Living people
Chinese female cross-country skiers
Olympic cross-country skiers of China
Cross-country skiers at the 2018 Winter Olympics
Cross-country skiers at the 2022 Winter Olympics
Place of birth missing (living people)
Cross-country skiers at the 2017 Asian Winter Games
Asian Games medalists in cross-country skiing
Asian Games silver medalists for China
Medalists at the 2017 Asian Winter Games
Cross-country skiers at the 2016 Winter Youth Olympics
People from Jixi
Skiers from Heilongjiang
21st-century Chinese women